Juan Millé Giménez (1884–1945) was a Spanish writer and a professor of literature.

Spanish philologists
Spanish male writers
1884 births
1945 deaths
People from Almería
20th-century philologists